The canton of Privas is an administrative division of the Ardèche department, southern France. Its borders were modified at the French canton reorganisation which came into effect in March 2015. Its seat is in Privas.

It consists of the following communes:
 
Ajoux
Alissas
Chomérac
Coux
Creysseilles
Flaviac
Freyssenet
Gourdon
Lyas
Pourchères
Pranles
Privas
Rochessauve
Saint-Priest
Veyras

References

Cantons of Ardèche